MACS 2129-1 is an early universe so-called 'dead' disk galaxy discovered by the Hubble Space Telescope from NASA. It lies approximately 10 billion light-years away from Earth (current distance 22 billion light years) . MACS 2129-1 has been described as 'dead' as it has ceased making new stars.

See also 
 List of galaxies

References 

Galaxies
Hubble Space Telescope
NASA
Discoveries using the Hubble Space Telescope